Robert Henry Bullock Marsham (3 September 1833 – 5 April 1913) was an English barrister and magistrate, known also as a cricketer, who made appearances for Oxford University and the Marylebone Cricket Club (MCC).

Life
Marsham was born at Merton College, Oxford, the son of Robert Bullock Marsham, the Warden of Merton, and a member of the extended family of the Earl of Romney. His brothers C. D. B. Marsham and Charles Marsham were also cricketers.

Primarily a bowler, Marsham took 35 wickets with his slow-medium roundarm deliveries. His greatest achievement was to bowl MCC to victory against a much stronger Surrey side in 1859, where he took twelve wickets in the match. He made many appearances for I Zingari, and also turned out for England against Kent in 1860.

Like his brothers, Marsham studied at Merton College. After graduating at Oxford he studied law, and was called to the bar at Lincoln's Inn in 1860. He was recorder of Maidstone 1868–79 and was also a magistrate. He died in Canterbury in 1913.

References

External links

1833 births
1913 deaths
Oxford University cricketers
Marylebone Cricket Club cricketers
English cricketers
Gentlemen cricketers
English cricketers of 1826 to 1863
Gentlemen of England cricketers
Alumni of Merton College, Oxford
English barristers
19th-century English judges
Gentlemen of Marylebone Cricket Club cricketers